Mario Martínez Rubio (born 25 March 1985 in Soria) is a Spanish professional footballer who plays as a midfielder.

Football career
A product of hometown club CD Numancia's youth system, Mario first appeared with their first team during 2002–03's second division – two games – then played 34 times scoring three goals in the 2007–08 season as the Soria side returned to La Liga after a three-year absence.

On 31 August 2008, four years after making his top-flight debut, Mario netted the only goal as Numancia surprisingly defeated FC Barcelona at home in what was Pep Guardiola's first league game as a manager. It would be his only in the campaign, as the team were immediately relegated.

After only 13 league matches out of 42 in 2010–11 (one complete), the 26-year-old Mario was released by Numancia, signing with Real Unión of the third level. He did not settle with any club or in any country in the following years, representing Olympiakos Nicosia, FC Baku, SD Tarazona and Jaguares de Córdoba.

On 3 July 2015, Mario joined Club Blooming in the Liga de Fútbol Profesional Boliviano. On 12 August, the team won their first Copa Cine Center after defeating Club Jorge Wilstermann 4–0 in the final, and he scored the opening goal.

Mario continuously switched clubs and countries in the following years, representing Boavista FC, PGS Kissamikos, Puerto Rico FC and Olimpia Grudziądz.

References

External links

1985 births
Living people
People from Soria
Sportspeople from the Province of Soria
Spanish footballers
Footballers from Castile and León
Association football midfielders
La Liga players
Segunda División players
Segunda División B players
Tercera División players
CD Numancia B players
CD Numancia players
UD Las Palmas players
Zamora CF footballers
Real Unión footballers
SD Tarazona footballers
Cypriot First Division players
Olympiakos Nicosia players
Azerbaijan Premier League players
FC Baku players
Bolivian Primera División players
Club Blooming players
Primeira Liga players
Boavista F.C. players
Football League (Greece) players
Aittitos Spata F.C. players
North American Soccer League players
Puerto Rico FC players
I liga players
Olimpia Grudziądz players
Spanish expatriate footballers
Expatriate footballers in Cyprus
Expatriate footballers in Azerbaijan
Expatriate footballers in Colombia
Expatriate footballers in Bolivia
Expatriate footballers in Portugal
Expatriate footballers in Greece
Expatriate soccer players in the United States
Expatriate footballers in Poland
Spanish expatriate sportspeople in Cyprus
Spanish expatriate sportspeople in Azerbaijan
Spanish expatriate sportspeople in Bolivia
Spanish expatriate sportspeople in Portugal
Spanish expatriate sportspeople in Greece
Spanish expatriate sportspeople in the United States
Spanish expatriate sportspeople in Poland